This is a list of notable residents of Newport Beach, California.

Arts

 Rikk Agnew, guitarist, vocalist of Social Distortion, Adolescents, Christian Death, and D.I.
 Howard Alden, jazz guitarist
 Steve Aoki, producer and DJ
 Lauren Bacall, actress
 Lewis Baltz, photographer
 Richard L. Bare, television director
 Drake Bell, singer-songwriter, actor, musician and voice actor
 Joey Bishop, entertainer
 Humphrey Bogart, actor, yachtsman
 George Burns, entertainer
 Nicolas Cage, actor
 Jeanne Cagney, actress
 William Cagney, producer
 Dick Dale, musician, "King of the Surf Guitar"
 JoAnn Dean Killingsworth, actress & dancer, first person to play Snow White at Disneyland
 Dolores del Río, actress
 Buddy Ebsen, actor
 Stan Frazier, musician, record producer, restaurateur
 Gunnar Gehl, singer-songwriter
 Leo Howard, actor
 Jeremy Jackson, actor
 Chuck Jones, cartoon artist, animator of Bugs Bunny and Daffy Duck
 Heather Paige Kent (now Heather DuBrow), actress and reality TV star
 David Denman, actor
 Dean Koontz, writer
 Brent Kutzle, musician and record producer, bassist and cellist for OneRepublic
 Heather Locklear, actress
 Lee Mallory, poet, retired professor
 Leslie Mann, actress
 Kelly McGillis, actress
 Ted McGinley, actor
 Helena Modjeska, actress
 McG, film and television director and producer
 Mark McGrath, singer, Sugar Ray
 Mike Ness of Social Distortion
 Anton Newcombe, guitarist, vocalist and founder of The Brian Jonestown Massacre
 Chuck Norris, martial artist and actor
 Cathy Rigby, gymnast and actress
 Ruen, American DJ and producer
 Gwen Stefani, singer, No Doubt
 Michael Steele (The Runaways, Elton Duck, The Bangles, Crash Wisdom)
 Emma Stone, actress
 Shirley Temple, actress
 Dr. John Townsend, award-winning author
 Thalia Tran, actress
 Elise Trouw, musician 
 Lisa Tucker, singer and actor
 Tom Tully, actor, The Lineup (1954–1960 CBS television series)
 Mamie Van Doren, actress and sex symbol
 John Wayne, actor and icon

Business
 George Argyros, real estate investor, former owner of Seattle Mariners
 Donald Bren, owner of Irvine Company
 William H. Gross, co-founder of Pimco
 John H. Meier, former business adviser to Howard Hughes
 Michael Morhaime, cofounder and chief executive of Blizzard Entertainment
 Randall Presley, real estate developer
 Gary Primm, casino developer and former chairman, chief executive of Primm Valley Resorts and Primadonna Resorts Inc.
Richard Roberts, chairman and chief executive officer of the Oral Roberts Evangelistic Association
 Henry Samueli, co-founder of Broadcom Corporation and owner of NHL's Anaheim Ducks

Sports

 Geoff Abrams, tennis player
 Nolan Arenado, MLB third baseman, St. Louis Cardinals
 Carsten Ball, Australian tennis player
 Matt Barkley, NFL quarterback, first freshman to start at that position for  USC
 Amanda Beard, swimmer and Olympic medalist
 Steve Birnbaum (born 1991), American soccer player
 Scott Boras, baseball player agent
 Francois Botha, heavyweight boxer
 Kobe Bryant, NBA player
 Dane Cameron, race car driver
 Sasha Cohen, figure skater
 Gerrit Cole, MLB player, New York Yankees
 Richie Collins, surfer 
 Fred Couples, golfer
Noah Davis (nicknamed Diesel; born 1997), MLB baseball pitcher, Colorado Rockies
 Taylor Dent, tennis player
 Roy Emerson, retired Australian tennis player
 Ekaterina Gordeeva, figure skater
 Betty Ann Grubb Stuart, tennis player
 Brett Hansen-Dent, tennis player
 Keith Hartwig, NFL player, Green Bay Packers
 Kyle Hendricks, Pitcher for the Chicago Cubs
 Dwight Howard, NBA player, Houston Rockets
 Reggie Jackson, Hall of Fame baseball player, lived in Newport Beach
 Jürgen Klinsmann, German football manager and former football player
 Kevin Kouzmanoff, MLB player, San Diego Padres
 Jillian Kraus (born 1986), water polo player
 Ilia Kulik, figure skater
 Joffery Lupul, NHL player, Toronto Maple Leafs
 Bill Macatee, sportscaster
 Karl Malone, retired NBA player
 Todd Marinovich, quarterback for USC and Oakland Raiders
 McKayla Maroney, retired olympic gymnast
 Scott Niedermayer, retired NHL player
 Dennis Rodman, retired NBA player
 Josh Samuels (born 1991), Olympic water polo player 
 Jerry Simon (born 1968), American-Israeli basketball player
 Leigh Steinberg, noted sports agent, said to be the model for the title character of Jerry Maguire
 Allison Stokke, pole vaulter, model
 Robert "Wingnut" Weaver, surfer
 John Welbourn, NFL player, New England Patriots
 C.J. Wilson, MLB starting pitcher for Los Angeles Angels of Anaheim
 Tiger Woods, professional golfer, born in Cypress
 George Yardley, NBA player in Basketball Hall of Fame
 Jason Zucker, NHL hockey player

References

 
Newport Beach, California
Newport Beach